"Dreamer" is a song produced and recorded by Italian house group Livin' Joy. It features vocals by American singer Janice Robinson, who also co-wrote the song. Originally released in August 1994, it was re-released in 1995 and topped the UK Singles Chart that May, ending 1995 as the UK's 40th-biggest-selling single of 1995. In the United States, it went to number-one on the Billboard Hot Dance Club Play chart. It was a sleeper hit on pop radio, but finally managed to peak at number 72 on the Billboard Hot 100 and number 75 on the Cash Box Top 100. MTV Dance ranked "Dreamer" number 15 in their list of "The 100 Biggest 90's Dance Anthems of All Time" in November 2011.

When the group was unable to reach a deal with Robinson for a follow-up single she was replaced by American singer Tameka Starr. Starr recorded a version of "Dreamer" for the Livin' Joy album entitled Don't Stop Movin', but the original by Janice Robinson was a hidden track on the album. In 2005, Robinson released her own version of "Dreamer" as a solo artist, reaching number five in the US Dance chart. In 2018, Robinson auditioned for the fifteenth series of The X Factor, singing "Dreamer" as her performance song 24 years after its original release in 1994.

Style
An example of Italo house and Eurodance, the song nonetheless is said to blend elements from different electronic genres. Tom Ewing of Freaky Trigger explained, "The bumping, cut-up rhythms and vocals that begin the remixed 'Dreamer' [that was a hit] feel like garage, for example, but as Janice Robinson takes the song into its urgently blissful chorus I want to call it house – or even go more specific and say handbag house, that showy, uplifting offshoot that strutted across superclub dancefloors in the mid-90s."

Chart performance
The song was first released in the United Kingdom on 22 August 1994, going straight in at number 18 in the UK Singles Chart. It had a slow and steady decline down the charts shortly after, slipping from its number 18 debut down to 67, exiting the top 100 the following week. On 22 October 1994, it returned to the UK charts after a few weeks out of the top 100, coming straight back in at number 85 before sliding to number 97 and then exiting the top 100 once more. The record seemed to show no signs of dying away as once more it re-entered the UK top 100 (on 12 November 1994) at number 99. The following week it climbed to number 85 before descending one final time to number 97 before it bowed out. However, on 7 May 1995, "Dreamer" returned to the chart, going all the way to number-one on the UK Singles Chart. It also reached the top position on the RM Club Chart by British magazine Music Week.

In Europe, the single was a top 10 hit also in Finland (10), Ireland (7) and Scotland (3), as well as on the Eurochart Hot 100, where it reached number six in May 1995.
Additionally, it entered the top 30 in the Netherlands (23) and the top 90 in Germany (87). Outside Europe, the single peaked at number-one on the US Billboard Hot Dance Club Play chart, number three on the RPM Dance/Urban chart in Canada, number 28 in Israel and number 90 in Australia. In the US, "Dreamer" peaked at number 72 on the Billboard Hot 100, number 75 on the Cash Box Top 100, number 38 on the Billboard Rhythmic Top 40 chart and number 10 on the Billboard Hot Dance Music/Maxi-Singles Sales chart. In mid-1996, "Dreamer" re-entered the Billboard Hot 100, reaching number 95.

Critical reception
Scottish Aberdeen Press and Journal complimented "Dreamer" as a "unforgettable summer stunner". Larry Flick from Billboard remarked that here, Livin' Joy "weaves an irresistible fabric of vibrant house rhythms, blippy electro synth sounds, and fluttering diva vocal loops. Single's stateside run is aided by fresh remixes from Junior Vasquez, who is also on quite a roll these days." He added, "The real beauty of this record is Janice Robinson's divine, lung-bursting vocal." In 1996, Dave Sholin from the Gavin Report said that though they enjoyed plenty of exposure on the Euro club scene, this track didn't quite get the support needed from American radio. "That was then, this is now. Early indications are that the second run for this high-energy entry will be a lot healthier." Howard Cohen from Knight-Ridder Newspapers complimented its "strong melody with punchy keyboards."

Andy Beevers from Music Week gave "Dreamer" four out of five, stating that "this happy house tune from Italy is bound to be a big club hit and its catchy female vocal should help it to cross over." Also on the 1995 re-release, the magazine rated it four out of five, praising it as "the club anthem that gets everyone dancing round their handbags." James Hamilton from the RM Dance Update declared it as an "maddeningly jaunty Italo pop bounder". Stephen Meade from The Network Forty noted that interest in the project had taken off quicker than the availability of the record. "True dance music for crossover radio is no easy trick; Livin' Joy has a story being told in the clubs. It's time for radio to embrace another hit record." Toni Birghental from Sun-Sentinel felt "Dreamer" "has great lyrics, but there's almost a sadness to them: "I never learned how to hold love and stay strong to me/Now I close my eyes now and I'm dreaming right where I belong"."

Retrospective response
In an 2013 retrospective review, Tom Ewing of Freaky Trigger rated the song nine out of ten, saying it is "not just about joy – the song’s chorus is a concentrated blurt of fierce hope, a fantasy of togetherness so intense but so impossible that Robinson takes it in double-time, like she’s trying to grab a moment – or a dream – before it vanishes. The song slinks and builds up to that point, its loping bass and keyboard figures giving Robinson space to stretch out a bit and approach lines like 'Love, life and laughter is all I believe' with the lived-in relish they deserve." He explained that it "captures the thing house, and handbag house, do better than almost anything: condense all the hopes, fears, desperation, and fantasies that a dancefloor magics into being, leaving an intense hit of pop that stays in your mind long after the night ends." In 2015, John Hamilton from Idolator called it the "giddy little sister" of Robin S' 1993 floor filler “Show Me Love", describing it as "ebullient". He added that "the jumbo-sized synth bloops and hyper, screeching organ" and "the rip-roaring chorus of “Dreamer” was guaranteed to stick in heads and make fools of amateur lip-syncers."

Music video

There are three versions of the music video for "Dreamer". The first video, for the 1994 version, was directed by Tom Laurie and had split-screen footage of sped up urban cityscapes with a silhouetted female dancer (unclear if this is Janice Robinson). For its 1995 re-release, a new video was made, in which Robinson is performing the song with some scenes on a carousel horse and other scenes on a brass bed and silver foiled background. She also has various changes of wigs and costumes throughout the video. Several shots go from colour to black and white, also intercut separately are dancers/models acting out seductive poses with one model taking a shower fully clothed and other shots with a model holding and stroking a Chihuahua dog. The third version is from the same 1995 re-release video shoot with the 7-inch edit version with alternative edited scenes.

Impact and legacy
In 1995, American DJ George Morel picked "Dreamer" as one of his "classic cuts", saying, "This is like Robin S but even more pumped up. It's better produced and the vocalist is amazing." In 2011, MTV Dance ranked the song number 15 in their list of "The 100 Biggest 90's Dance Anthems of All Time". In 2015, Idolator ranked it number 17 in their list of "The 50 Best Pop Singles of 1995". In 2017, BuzzFeed ranked it number 74 in their list of "The 101 Greatest Dance Songs of the '90s", writing, "Female vocals set to a house beat = everything you could want from an early-'90s dance song."

Track listings
 1994 UK CD single
 "Dreamer" (Radio Mix) 3:40
 "Dreamer" (2" Deep Pan Mix) 5:36
 "Dreamer" (Original Mix) 5:39
 "Dreamer" (Slo Moshun Mix) 10:48
 "Dreamer" (Luvdup Mix) 5:08
 "Dreamer" (Swing 52 Dub) 7:51

 1994 US CD single
 "Dreamer" (Original Club Mix) 5:39
 "Dreamer" (Slo Moshun Mix) 10:37
 "Dreamer" (Junior's Sound Factory Mix) 9:47
 "Dreamer" (Factory Dub) 7:05
 "Dreamer" (Junior Vasquez Sound Factory Instrumental) 9:44
 "Dreamer" (Radio Mix) 3:38

 1995 UK re-release CD
 "Dreamer" (7-inch Mix) 3:44
 "Dreamer" (Original Club Mix) 5:39
 "Dreamer" (Rollo Armstrong Big Mix) 8:36
 "Dreamer" (Loveland's Viva Tenerife Mix) 6:53
 "Dreamer" (Junior Vasquez Sound Factory Mix) 8:56
 "Dreamer" (Jupiter 12-inch Collision Mix) 6:01

Charts

Weekly charts

Year-end charts

Certifications

Alex Party vs. Livin' Joy
Gianni Visnadi (one of the two producers behind Livin' Joy) was no stranger to the UK chart at this point. He and his brother Paolo had already released a previous dance track under the Alex Party banner. "Read My Lips/Saturday Night Party" was released on 18 December 1993 where it entered at number 49. It remained in the top 100 for 6 weeks before it was re-released yet again on 28 May 1994. This time he had a little more success as "Read My Lips" peaked at number 29. It spent 5 weeks in the top 100.

After seeing the moderate success of "Dreamer" and "Read My Lips", both Paolo and Gianni then decided to focus on Alex Party once again to record "Don't Give Me Your Life" which peaked at number 2 in the United Kingdom where it spent 8 weeks in the top 10 and a total of 14 weeks in the top 100. After the major success of "Don't Give Me Your Life", the signature Visnadi sounds of thumping beats, commanding vocals and the organ sounds and synths had cemented themselves as the popular sound in dance music. Visnadi decided to revive "Dreamer" under the Livin' Joy banner. It received an updated remix but stayed true to its original form. This was the single that finally took the Visnadi brothers to number one, beating the out-going number one by Oasis by a narrow margin of just 500 sales.

"Wrap Me Up" entered the chart on 18 November 1995 and peaked at number 17, spending just six weeks in the top 100. As a last stab at success under the Alex Party banner, Visnadi remixed and re-released "Read My Lips". This did not match the success of "Don't Give Me Your Life", crashing into the top 40 at number 28 where it dropped out of the UK top 100 in just two weeks. Alex Party was then scrapped and their focus was back on Livin' Joy.

Janice Robinson solo version

Track listings
 2005 CD, maxi-single
 "Dreamer" (ReMixed) (Jack D. Elliot Rebirth club mix) – 6:27
 "Dreamer" (ReMixed) (Xenon's mix) – 7:00
 "Dreamer" (ReMixed) (Jamie J Sanchez club mix) – 7:37
 "Dreamer" (ReMixed) (Livewater Futuristic club vocal) – 8:56
 "Dreamer" (ReMixed) (Twisted Dee club mix) – 8:21

 2006 5× File, MP3
 "Dreamer" (ReMixed) (Joe Bermudez & Klubjumpers Nocternal Emissions club mix) – 8:46
 "Dreamer" (ReMixed) (Nic Mercy's Epic Anthem) – 9:30
 "Dreamer" (ReMixed) (John Farruggio's club mix) – 9:27
 "Dreamer" (ReMixed) (Radboy's Rockin' mix) – 7:44
 "Dreamer" (ReMixed) (Dancin' Divaz club mix) – 7:34

Matt Helders version
A cover version of the song by Arctic Monkeys drummer Matt Helders was released on his Late Night Tales compilation in 2008. This version features vocals from Nesreen Shah. It was also released as a 7-inch vinyl single limited to 1000 copies. Arctic Monkeys lead singer Alex Turner's spoken word story "A Choice Of Three" appears as a b-side.

See also
 List of number-one dance singles of 1994 (U.S.)

References

1994 songs
1994 debut singles
1995 singles
Livin' Joy songs
MCA Records singles
UK Singles Chart number-one singles
Music Week number-one dance singles
Songs written by Janice Robinson